Little Man may refer to:

Characters
 The Little Man (The Pink Panther), a recurring character in The Pink Panther cartoons
 Clayton Chester "Little Man" Logan, from the novel Roll of Thunder, Hear My Cry
 Wintell "Little Man" Royce, from the Barksdale Organization on the TV series The Wire

Films

Little Man (2005 film), a documentary by Nicole Conn
Little Man (2006 film), a motion picture featuring the Wayans brothers

Music
"Little Man" (Sia song), 2000
"Little Man" (Alan Jackson song), 1999
"Little Man" (Sonny & Cher song), 1966
Little Man (album), a 2006 album by The Pineapple Thief
"Little Man", a song by Little Dragon from the 2001 album Ritual Union
"Little Man", a song by The O.C. Supertones from the 1997 album Supertones Strike Back
"Mali čovek", meaning "Little Man" in Serbo-Croatian, by the band Šarlo Akrobata

Other uses
 Little Man (Cheyenne Arrow Keeper), a Cheyenne Holy Man
 The Little Man (comics), a 1998 collection of comic book stories by Chester Brown
 Little man computer, a simplified machine/assembly language computer for educational purposes
 Homunculus (Latin: little man), a term used in various fields to refer to any representation of a human being
 Skiddaw Little Man, a fell in the English Lake District
 The "Little Man", a cartoon used to evaluate stage and film productions reviewed in the San Francisco Chronicle

See also
 Little Men (disambiguation)
 Wee Man, stage name of Jason Acuña (born 1973), American stunt performer and television personality